Ketlen Vieira da Silva (born August 26, 1991) is a Brazilian mixed martial artist and currently competes in the Bantamweight division of the Ultimate Fighting Championship (UFC).  As of February 27, 2023, she is ranked #3 in the UFC women's bantamweight rankings.

Background 
Vieira was born in Manaus, Amazonas, Brazil. She started training Brazilian Jiu-Jitsu and when she was twelve she started training in Judo. She holds black belts in both disciplines. She is also a decorated wrestler with multiple prestigious titles, including Brazilian national wrestling championship. She studied law at University Nilton Lins, but dropped out in order to pursuit a career in mixed martial arts. She eventually transitioned to MMA and trained under Marcinho Pontes, who was José Aldo's early coach at Nova Uniao Manaus gym.

Mixed martial arts career

Early career 
Vieira fought all of her fights in Brazil where she made her professional debut on October 2, 2014, at Circuito de Lutas: Fight Night 4 in São Paulo. She faced Juliana Leite and knocked out Leite in round two. She continued to win the next 5 fights under Mr. Cage and Big Way Fight Night banners where she won the Mr. Cage bantamweight title. Vieira amassed a record of 6–0 in 17 months prior to being signed by the UFC.

Ultimate Fighting Championship 
Vieira made her promotional debut on October 1, 2016, at UFC Fight Night: Lineker vs. Dodson in Portland, Oregon, United States. She faced Kelly Faszholz and ultimately edged out her opponent to win by split decision. In the post fight interview, Vieira explained her difficulty with weight cutting for this fight. Two days prior to the scheduled fight, she needed to drink one liter of water to provide a urine sample to USADA, which interfered with the process of her weight cut prior to the USADA visit.

She took on Ashlee Evans-Smith at UFC on Fox: Johnson vs. Reis on April 15, 2017. After three rounds, the judges handed the victory to Vieira via unanimous decision with the score board of (29–28, 30–27, 29–28).

Vieira was originally expected to face Sara McMann at UFC 214 on July 29, 2017. However, the fight was moved to UFC 215 on September 9, 2017. Vieira won the bout via arm-triangle choke submission in the second round.

A bout against Germaine de Randamie was announced for UFC Fight Night: Machida vs. Anders on February 3, 2018. However, the bout was soon cancelled due to a hand injury sustained by de Randamie.
 
Vieira faced Cat Zingano on March 3, 2018, at UFC 222. She won the fight via split decision.

Vieira was scheduled to face Tonya Evinger on September 22, 2018, at UFC Fight Night: Santos vs. Anders. However, on August 7, 2018, she pulled out due to a knee injury.

Vieira fought Irene Aldana on December 14, 2019, at UFC 245. She lost the fight by knockout in the first round.

Vieira was scheduled to face Marion Reneau on May 9, 2020, at UFC 250. Due to the event being relocated to the United States, Vieira being unable to compete due to visa issues: However, on April 9, Dana White, the president of UFC announced that this event was postponed to a future date Instead, Vieira was scheduled to face Yana Kunitskaya on August 1, 2020, at UFC Fight Night: Holm vs. Aldana, and on July 15, 2020, it was announced that the bout was moved to UFC Fight Night 174 on August 8, 2020.  Subsequently, Vieira was removed from the card on July 30 for undisclosed reasons and replaced by Julija Stoliarenko.

The bout with Reneau was rescheduled and was expected to take place on September 27, 2020, at UFC 253.  However, Reneau withdrew from the bout citing an undisclosed injury and she was replaced by Sijara Eubanks.  Vieira won the fight via unanimous decision.

The bout with Yana Kunitskaya was rescheduled and eventually took place on February 20, 2021, at UFC Fight Night 185. At the weigh-ins, Vieira weighed in at 138 pounds, two pounds over the women's bantamweight non-title fight limit. She was fined 20% of her purse which went to her opponent, Kunitskaya, and the bout proceeded at a catchweight. Vieira lost the fight via unanimous decision.

Vieira was scheduled for a rematch against Sara McMann on August 28, 2021, at UFC on ESPN 30.  However, McMann announced in mid August that a "reinjury" forced her out of the bout. Instead, Vieira was scheduled to face Miesha Tate on October 16, 2021, at UFC Fight Night 195. However, on September 22, the bout was pulled from the card when Tate tested positive for COVID-19. The bout was rebooked to November 20, 2021, as the main event of UFC Fight Night 198. Vieira won the bout via unanimous decision.

Vieira faced Holly Holm on May 21, 2022, at UFC Fight Night 206. She won the fight via controversial split decision. 18 out of 20 media outlets scored the bout as a win for Holm.

Vieira faced Raquel Pennington on January 14, 2023, at UFC Fight Night 217. She lost the fight via split decision.

Championships and accomplishments

Mixed martial arts 
Ultimate Fighting Championship
 Tied (Raquel Pennington) for most split decision wins in UFC Women's Bantamweight division history (3)

 Mr. Cage
 Mr. Cage Women's Bantamweight Champion

Mixed martial arts record 

|-
|Loss
|align=center|13–3
|Raquel Pennington
|Decision (split)
|UFC Fight Night: Strickland vs. Imavov
|
|align=center|3
|align=center|5:00
|Las Vegas, Nevada, United States
|
|-
|Win
|align=center|13–2
|Holly Holm
|Decision (split)
|UFC Fight Night: Holm vs. Vieira
|
|align=center|5
|align=center|5:00
|Las Vegas, Nevada, United States
|
|-
|Win
|align=center|12–2
|Miesha Tate
|Decision (unanimous)
|UFC Fight Night: Vieira vs. Tate
|
|align=center|5
|align=center|5:00
|Las Vegas, Nevada, United States
|
|-
|Loss
|align=center|11–2
|Yana Kunitskaya
|Decision (unanimous)
|UFC Fight Night: Blaydes vs. Lewis 
|
|align=center|3
|align=center|5:00
|Las Vegas, Nevada, United States
|  
|-
|Win
|align=center|11–1
|Sijara Eubanks
|Decision (unanimous)
|UFC 253 
|
|align=center|3
|align=center|5:00
|Abu Dhabi, United Arab Emirates
|  
|-->  
|-
|Loss
|align=center|10–1
|Irene Aldana
|KO (punches) 
|UFC 245 
|
|align=center|1
|align=center|4:51
|Las Vegas, Nevada, United States
|   
|- 
|Win
|align=center| 10–0
|Cat Zingano
|Decision (split)
|UFC 222 
|
|align=center|3
|align=center|5:00
|Las Vegas, Nevada, United States
|
|-
|Win
|align=center| 9–0
|Sara McMann
|Submission (arm-triangle choke)
|UFC 215 
|
|align=center|2
|align=center|4:16
|Edmonton, Alberta, Canada
|
|-
| Win
| align=center| 8–0
| Ashlee Evans-Smith
| Decision (unanimous)
| UFC on Fox: Johnson vs. Reis
| 
| align=center| 3
| align=center| 5:00
| Kansas City, Missouri, United States
|
|-
| Win
| align=center| 7–0
| Kelly Faszholz
| Decision (split)
| UFC Fight Night: Lineker vs. Dodson
| 
| align=center| 3
| align=center| 5:00
| Portland, Oregon, United States
|
|-
| Win
| align=center| 6–0
| Estefani Almeida
| Decision (unanimous)
| Big Way Fight Night 9
| 
| align=center| 3
| align=center| 5:00
| Manaus, Brazil
|
|-
| Win
| align=center| 5–0
| Jessica Maciel
| TKO (punches)
| Mr. Cage 20
| 
| align=center| 1
| align=center| 3:20
| Manaus, Brazil
|
|-
| Win
| align=center| 4–0
| Laet Ferreira
| Submission (rear-naked choke)
| Big Way Fight Night 1
| 
| align=center| 1
| align=center| 2:22
| Manaus, Brazil
|
|-
| Win
| align=center| 3–0
| Monique Bastos
| Submission (rear-naked choke)
| Mr. Cage 16
| 
| align=center| 1
| align=center| 4:07
| Manaus, Brazil
|
|-
| Win
| align=center| 2–0
| Kenya Miranda da Silva
| Submission (kimura)
| Mr. Cage 14
| 
| align=center| 2
| align=center| N/A
| Manaus, Brazil
|
|-
| Win
| align=center| 1–0
| Juliana Leite
| TKO (punches)
| Circuito de Lutas: Fight Night 4
| 
| align=center| 2
| align=center| 1:36
| São Paulo, Brazil
|
|-

See also
 List of current UFC fighters
 List of female mixed martial artists

References

External links
 
 

Living people
1991 births
Brazilian female mixed martial artists
Bantamweight mixed martial artists
Mixed martial artists utilizing Brazilian jiu-jitsu
Mixed martial artists utilizing judo
Mixed martial artists utilizing wrestling
LGBT mixed martial artists
Brazilian practitioners of Brazilian jiu-jitsu
Female Brazilian jiu-jitsu practitioners
Brazilian female judoka
People from Manaus
People awarded a black belt in Brazilian jiu-jitsu
Ultimate Fighting Championship female fighters
Sportspeople from Amazonas (Brazilian state)
20th-century Brazilian women
21st-century Brazilian women